Placomaronea is a genus of lichenized fungi in the family Candelariaceae. It has 6 species. The genus was circumscribed by Finnish lichenologist Veli Räsänen in 1944, with Placomaronea candelarioides assigned as the type species. The genus was revised by Martin Westberg and colleagues in 2009, who accepted six species in the genus.

Species
Placomaronea candelarioides  – South America
Placomaronea fuegiana  – southeastern South America
Placomaronea kaernefeltii  – Chile
Placomaronea lambii  – Peru; Ecuador
Placomaronea mendozae  – Argentina; Peru; Arizona (USA)
Placomaronea minima  – Chile; Argentina; southern Africa

References

Candelariales
Ascomycota genera
Taxa described in 1944
Lichen genera
Taxa named by Veli Räsänen